A burndown chart or burn down chart is a graphical representation of work left to do versus time. The outstanding work (or backlog) is often on the vertical axis, with time along the horizontal. A burn down chart is a run chart of outstanding work. It is useful for predicting when all of the work will be completed.  It is often used in agile software development methodologies such as Scrum.  However, burn down charts can be applied to any project containing measurable progress over time.

Outstanding work can be represented in terms of either time or story points (a sort of arbitrary unit).

Reading burn down charts 

A burn down chart for a completed iteration is shown above and can be read by knowing the following:

Measuring performance 

The above table is only one way of interpreting the shape of the burn down chart. There are others.

Removing variability in time estimates 
One issue that may be noticed in burn down charts is that whether or not the Actual Work line is above or below the Ideal Work line depends on how accurate the original time estimates are. This means that if a team constantly overestimates time requirements, the progress will always appear ahead of schedule. If they constantly underestimate time requirements, they will always appear behind schedule. This issue is corrected by incorporating an efficiency factor into the burn down chart. After the first iteration of a project, the efficiency factor can be recalculated to allow for more accurate estimates during the next iteration. Some templates automatically calculate the efficiency as a project progresses. This can be used to identify areas/phases where inaccurate estimates consistently occur.

Burnup chart 
A burnup chart or burn-up chart is a diagram of complete work, and is sometimes used as an alternative to the burndown chart. Similar to the burndown chart, the burnup chart shows time on the horizontal axis and work completed the vertical axis. The difference is that the burnup chart starts on the bottom and rises as tasks are completed (opposite to the burndown chart). Similarly to burndown charts, the work can be measured in several ways, like for instance using time or story points. Burnup charts are less common compared to burndown charts.

See also 
 Velocity (software development)

References

Further reading 
 Understanding the Scrum Burndown Chart
 Release Burndown
 Burndown Chart Example Patterns
 Common Burn Down Chart Patterns and Considerations 

Project management techniques
Agile software development
Charts